Bosnian–Ragusan War (1403–1404), sometimes called Second Bosnian–Ragusan War, was a military conflict fought between the Kingdom of Bosnia and the Republic of Ragusa between 1403 and 1404, which ended with a treaty signed officially in 1405. In 1403 Stephen Ostoja of Bosnia sided with King Ladislaus of Naples in his plights against the Hungarian King Sigismund, Bosnia's liege. King Ostoja led a war against the Ragusans, Sigismund's allies.

Radič Sanković led the attacks on Dubrovnik in the name of Stephen Ostoja.  Sandalj Hranić captured and blinded Radič, and held him in prison until his death in 1404. Among the fallen noblemen were Vukosav Nikolić and the Duke of Slano.

The Ragusans set fire to Šumet and Žrnovnica, so the Bosnian army retreated.

References

Bosnian-Ragusan War
Military history of the Republic of Ragusa
1403 in Europe
Conflicts in 1403
15th century in Bosnia
Battles involving the Kingdom of Bosnia
Wars involving medieval Bosnian state